Zachary Burt (born 4 September 1993) is a Canadian judoka.

He is the bronze medallist of the 2017 Judo Grand Slam Abu Dhabi in the -90 kg category.

References

External links
 

1993 births
Living people
Canadian male judoka
Judoka at the 2015 Pan American Games